Dichomeris brevicornuta is a moth in the family Gelechiidae. It was described by Hou-Hun Li, Hui Zhen and Wolfram Mey in 2013. It is found in South Africa.

The wingspan is 10–11 mm. The forewings are dark brown, without obvious markings. The hindwings are dark grey.

Etymology
The species name refers to the cornutus which is shorter than that of related Dichomeris hamata and is derived from Latin brev- (meaning short) and cornutus (meaning "having horns" referring to male genitalia).

References

Moths described in 2013
brevicornuta